László Somfai (born 15 August 1934) is a Hungarian musicologist.

He was born in 1934 in Jászladány. He first studied History of Music, graduating in 1959 with a dissertation on the classical string quartet idiom of Joseph Haydn. He went on to earn a PhD in musicology.

He is a professor at the Franz Liszt Academy of Music, where he specializes in classical style, Haydn, and Béla Bartók. He has also taught at the City University of New York and the University of California, Berkeley.

Among his work is the BB catalogue of Bartók's compositions.

External links
 Biography at bartokfestival.hu
 Biography at mindentudas.hu

1934 births
Living people
Hungarian musicologists
International Musicological Society presidents
Bartók scholars